Luis Ossio Sanjinés (1930 – September 27, 2016) served as the 34th vice president of Bolivia from 1989 to 1993, during the presidency of Jaime Paz Zamora. He belonged to the Christian Democratic Party (in Spanish: Partido Demócrata Cristiano (PDC)).

Ossio died at the age of 86 on September 27, 2016.

References

1930 births
2016 deaths
Vice presidents of Bolivia
Christian Democratic Party (Bolivia) politicians